Bramberk is a stone observation tower in the municipality of Lučany nad Nisou in the Czech Republic. It is located on the hill Bramberk (787 m above sea level) in the Jizera Mountains. It is 21 metres high, with 87 steps to the top. It was built in 1912.

See also
 Slovanka, another observation tower nearby

External links
 Brief history with photographs in Czech

Towers in the Czech Republic
Tourism in the Czech Republic